El-Marg is a station on the Cairo Metro that is located at El-Marg district in north east Cairo, Egypt.  It is on Line 1 and is an above ground station.

History
El-Marg Station was inaugurated on 5 April 1989 as part of phase 2 of Line 1.

See also
 Cairo Metro
 Cairo Metro Line 1
 List of Cairo Metro stations

References

External links
 Cairo Metro 
 National Authority for Tunnels official website

Cairo metro stations
1989 establishments in Egypt
Railway stations opened in 1989